Sindi Turf Hindnagar is a census town in Wardha district in the Indian state of Maharashtra.

Demographics
 India census, Sindi Turf Hindnagar had a population of 15,549. Males constitute 52% of the population and females 48%. Sindi Turf Hindnagar has an average literacy rate of 79%, higher than the national average of 59.5%: male literacy is 83%, and female literacy is 74%. In Sindi Turf Hindnagar, 11% of the population is under 6 years of age.

References

Cities and towns in Wardha district